Pristidactylus volcanensis is a species of lizard in the family Leiosauridae. The species is endemic to Chile.

References

Pristidactylus
Reptiles of Chile
Reptiles described in 1987
Endemic fauna of Chile